John Harold Johnson (January 19, 1918 – August 8, 2005) was an American businessman and publisher. Johnson was the founder in 1942 of the Johnson Publishing Company, headquartered in Chicago, Illinois. Johnson's company, with its Ebony (1945) and Jet (1951) magazines, was among the most influential African-American business in media in the second half of the twentieth century. In 1982, Johnson became the first African American to appear on the Forbes 400. In 1987, Johnson was named Black Enterprise Entrepreneur of the year. in 1996, he was awarded the Presidential Medal of Freedom.

Biography

Early years and education 

Johnson was born in Arkansas City, Arkansas.  His family moved to Chicago at time the 1933 Chicago World's Fair, during the Great Migration of African Americans out of the South. Johnson endured much teasing and taunting at his high school for his ragged clothes and country ways, as he encountered something he never knew existed: middle-class blacks. Johnson later transferred to DuSable High School for his junior and senior years. His classmates at DuSable included Nat King Cole and Redd Foxx. This only fueled his already formidable determination to "make something of himself". Johnson's high-school career was distinguished by the leadership qualities he demonstrated as student council president and as editor of the school newspaper and class yearbook. He attended high school during the day and studied self-improvement books at night. After he graduated with honors in 1936, he was offered a tuition scholarship to the University of Chicago, but he thought he would have to decline it, because he could not figure out a way to pay for expenses other than tuition. Because of his achievements in high school, Johnson was invited to speak at a dinner held by the Urban League. When Harry Pace, president of the Supreme Life Insurance Company, heard Johnson's speech, he was so impressed with the young man that he offered Johnson a job so that he would be able to use the scholarship.

Johnson began as an office boy at Supreme Life and within two years had become Pace's assistant. His duties included preparing a monthly digest of newspaper articles, with help from his publisher, "Madam DuBois." Johnson began to wonder if other people in the community might not enjoy the same type of service. He conceived of a publication patterned after Reader's Digest. His work at Supreme Life also gave him the opportunity to see the day-to-day operations of a business owned by an African American and fostered his dream of starting a business of his own.

Johnson Publishing Company

Negro Digest
Once the idea of Negro Digest occurred to him, it began to seem like a "black gold mine", Johnson stated in his autobiography Succeeding against the Odds. He remained enthusiastic even though he was discouraged on all sides from doing so. Only his mother, a woman with biblical faith and deep religious convictions, as well as a powerful belief in her son, supported his vision and allowed him to use her furniture as collateral for a $500 loan. He used this loan to publish the first edition of Negro Digest in 1942. Johnson had a problem with distribution until he teamed up with Joseph Levy, a magazine distributor who was impressed with him. Levy provided valuable marketing tips and opened the doors that allowed the new digest to reach newsstands in other urban centers. Within six months circulation had reached 50,000. This publication covered African-American history, literature, arts, and cultural issues. After several decades of publication its name was changed to Black World.

Ebony and JET
Although Negro Digest achieved some success and at its height had a circulation of more than 100,000, it was dwarfed by Johnson's subsequent publication, Ebony, which was so popular that its initial run of 25,000 copies easily sold out. The articles in Ebony, which were designed to look like those in Life or Look magazines, emphasized the achievements of successful African Americans. Photo essays about current events and articles about race relations were also included in the magazine. Initially focused on the rich and famous in the African-American community, Johnson expanded the reporting to include issues such as "the white problem in America", African-American militancy, crimes by African Americans against African Americans, civil rights legislation, Freedom Rides and marches, and other aspects of segregation and discrimination. Professional historians were recruited for the magazine's staff so that the contributions of African Americans to the history of the United States could be adequately documented. African-American models were used in the magazine's advertisements and a conscious effort was made to portray positive aspects of African-American life and culture. Everything in the magazine was addressed to the African-American consumer. Johnson maintained that Ebony′s success was due to the positive image of African Americans that it offered.

In 1951, Johnson launched Tan, a "true confessions"-type magazine. In 1951, Jet, a weekly news digest, began. Later publications included African American Stars and Ebony Jr., a children's magazine. Although all of the magazines achieved a measure of success, none was able to compete with Ebony, which in its 40th year of publication had a circulation of 2,300,000 and was the primary reason that Johnson was considered one of the 400 richest individuals in the United States. One of Johnson's most notable issues of Jet was the September 15, 1955 issue in which he published a picture of a Chicago–youth Emmett Till's mutilated body after it had arrived in Chicago from Mississippi. People considered Johnson's decision to publish Till's photograph his greatest moment. Michigan congressman Charles Diggs recalled that given the emotion the image stimulated, it was "probably one of the greatest media products in the last 40 or 50 years".

Other ventures
In addition, Johnson Publishing owned Fashion Fair Cosmetics (the world's number one makeup and skin care company for women of color), and Supreme Beauty products (hair care for men and women), and was involved in television production and produced the Ebony Fashion Fair (the world's largest traveling fashion show), which has donated over $47 million to charity. The show visited more than 200 cities in the United States, Canada and the Caribbean. Johnson Publishing also has a book division which employed more than 2,600 people, with sales of over $388 million. Johnson purchased three radio stations, started a book publishing company, and a television production company, and served on the board of directors of several major businesses, including the Greyhound Corporation. In 2019, the remaining assets of Johnson Publishing Company were sold as part of a Chapter 7 bankruptcy proceeding.

Honors and awards 
Johnson received numerous honors and awards for his achievements, including the National Association for the Advancement of Colored People's Spingarn Medal in 1966 for his contributions in the area of race relations. In 1951, he was the first African American to be selected as Young Man of the Year by the United States Chamber of Commerce. In 1972, he was named publisher of the year by the major magazine publishers in the United States. In 1986, Johnson received the Golden Plate Award of the American Academy of Achievement. He received a Candace Award for Distinguished Service from the National Coalition of 100 Black Women in 1989. In 1993, to celebrate the 50th anniversary of his publishing company, Johnson published his autobiography, in which he states "if it could happen to a Black boy from Arkansas it could happen to anyone".

In 1995, Johnson received the Communication Award on the occasion of Ebony magazine's 50th anniversary. Alfred C. Sykes, chairman of the Center for Communication, and president of Hearst Media Technology, said| "Mr. Johnson is a role model for many young people today, an example of how hard work, commitment and belief in oneself can lead to outstanding achievement. He rose from disadvantaged circumstances to achieve success in both business and national service during a time when great obstacles were placed in his path." Because of his influential position in the African-American community, Johnson was invited by the US government to participate in several international missions. In 1959, he accompanied the vice president of the United States on a mission to Russia and Poland. He was appointed special ambassador to represent the United States at the independence ceremonies in Côte d'Ivoire in 1961 and in Kenya in 1963. Over the years Johnson had devoted a portion of several issues of Ebony to articles relating to African independence movements, but in August 1976 he dedicated an entire special issue to the subject "Africa, the Continent of the Future".

In 1996, President Bill Clinton bestowed the Presidential Medal of Freedom on Johnson. In 1997, Johnson was inducted into the Junior Achievement National Business Hall of Fame. In early 2001, Johnson was inducted into the Arkansas Business Hall of Fame. The founder, publisher, chairman and CEO of the largest African-American publishing company in the world advised the audience to, "Convince people it is in their best interest to help you." By that year, Johnson had received other awards, including the Horatio Alger Award and The Wall Street Journal Dow Jones Entrepreneurial Excellence Award. He held the distinction of having been the first African American placed on Forbes' list of 400 wealthiest Americans. He was also awarded honorary doctorates by the University of Arkansas at Pine Bluff, Harvard University, the University of Southern California, Carnegie Mellon University, Eastern Michigan University, and Wayne State University. Johnson served on the boards of directors of Dillard's Inc.; First Commercial Bank, Little Rock; Dial Corporation; Zenith Radio Corporation; and Chrysler Corporation. Johnson became a member of the Alpha Phi Alpha fraternity, Chicago-based Theta chapter, in 1937.

Death, funeral and legacy 
On August 8, 2005, Johnson died of congestive heart failure. At the time of his death, Johnson was survived by his wife, daughter Linda Johnson-Rice and a granddaughter. His son, John Jr. died in December 1981 after a long battle with an illness related to sickle cell at age 25. Following his death, a public viewing of his body was held at Johnson Publishing Headquarters on August 16, 2005. Johnson's funeral was held at University of Chicago's Rockefeller Memorial Chapel where an estimated 3,000 people attended, including former U.S. president Bill Clinton, future U.S. president Barack Obama, and civil rights leader Jesse Jackson. Johnson was buried at Oak Woods Cemetery, in the Greater Grand Crossing neighborhood in Chicago.

In 2010, the Noble Network of Charter Schools and Chicago Public Schools opened Johnson College Prep High School, a public charter high school in Chicago Illinois' Englewood neighborhood in honor of Johnson and his wife Eunice. On January 31, 2012, the United States Postal Service honored John H. Johnson with a commemorative stamp as the newest addition to its Black Heritage Series. The School of Communications at Howard University was to be named in his honor but instead, the $4 million donation was used to endow a chair in entrepreneurship. Johnson was inducted into the Chicago Literary Hall of Fame in 2013.

In 2019, the Arkansas Legislature created John H. Johnson Day to pay tribute to his legacy and to help support a museum (his childhood home) named in his honor in Arkansas City. The Friends of the John H. Johnson Museum suggested November 1 as the date for the holiday because that was the date the first issue of Ebony was published.

See also 
 African-American business history

References

Further reading 
 Johnson, John H. Succeeding Against the Odds: The Autobiography of a Great American Businessman (1989).
 
 
 Who's Who in Colored America, 1950, pp. 305–306.
 Chicago Defender, January 6, 1962, p. A15.

External links 
 
 Biography at the Johnson Publishing Company
 John H. Johnson memorial service program) at the Johnson Publishing Company
 John H. Johnson's oral history video excerpts at the National Visionary Leadership Project
 Find A Grave

1918 births
2005 deaths
20th-century American journalists
American male journalists
African-American businesspeople
African-American journalists
African-American publishers (people)
American magazine founders
American publishers (people)
Businesspeople from Arkansas
Businesspeople from Chicago
Johnson Publishing Company
John Harold
Northwestern University alumni
People from Arkansas City, Arkansas
Presidential Medal of Freedom recipients
Spingarn Medal winners
University of Chicago alumni
20th-century American businesspeople
20th-century African-American people
21st-century African-American people